The 1993 Spengler Cup was held in Davos, Switzerland from December 26 to December 31, 1993.  All matches were played at HC Davos's home arena, Eisstadion Davos. The final was won 6–3 by Färjestads BK over HC Davos.

Teams participating
 HC Davos
 Färjestads BK
 Traktor Chelyabinsk
 Team Canada
 Jokerit

Tournament

Round-Robin results

Finals

External links
Spenglercup.ch

1993-94
1993–94 in Swiss ice hockey
1993–94 in Russian ice hockey
1993–94 in Canadian ice hockey
1993–94 in Finnish ice hockey
1993–94 in Swedish ice hockey
December 1993 sports events in Europe